A kangaroo mouse is either one of the two species of jumping mouse (genus Microdipodops) native to the deserts of the southwestern United States, predominantly found in the state of Nevada. The name "kangaroo mouse" refers to the species' extraordinary jumping ability, as well as its habit of bipedal locomotion.    The two species are:
Dark kangaroo mouse – Microdipodops megacephalus
Pale kangaroo mouse – Microdipodops pallidus

Both species of kangaroo mouse live in sandy desert ecosystems, and forage for seeds and vegetation amongst the scrub brush of their native habitat.  The dark kangaroo mouse is also known to feed occasionally on insects and carrion. The mouse rarely drinks water, instead deriving it metabolically from the foods it eats.  The kangaroo mouse collects food and maintains large caches in their burrows, which are excavated to a length of between 3 and 8 feet (1 to 2.5 meters).  The burrow, the entrance to which the mouse covers during daylight hours, is also used to raise litters of between 2 and 7 young.  The pale kangaroo mouse burrows only in fine sand, while the dark kangaroo mouse prefers fine, gravelly soils but may also burrow in sand or sandy soil.  Kangaroo mice are nocturnal, and are most active in the two hours following sunset.  They are believed to hibernate during cold weather. Although mitochondrial data indicate that the clades appear to be in approximate genetic equilibrium and have not suffered any extreme bottlenecks over time, there is still concern for the survival of smaller and more vulnerable Microdipodops subpopulations due to impending habitat threats in the Great Basin Desert.

The kangaroo mice are closely related to the kangaroo rats, which belong to the same subfamily, Dipodomyinae.

Distinguishing features 
The difference between a pale and dark kangaroo mouse is the color of their fur which is suggested in their names. While a dark kangaroo mouse has dark brown and black fur, a pale kangaroo mouse has a lighter, pale brown color.

Both pale and dark Microdipodops species share the same features such as having wide eyes, long and silky fur, shorten forelegs, long hind legs, and a long, slim tail with fur at the end that is used for balance. The average tail is 84 mm (inclusive of a range of 68 mm to 103 mm). Their hind legs are proportionately large with fringed stiff hairs at the side and the undersurface of their feet to help through movement in sandy desert habitats. An average kangaroo mouse adult weighs 13.5g (inclusive of a range from 10g to 17g) with an average total length of 158.5 mm (inclusive of a range from 140 mm to 177 mm) and an average hind foot with the length of 25 mm.

Due to their extremely inflated auditory bullae, that is extended in the upper portion of their head, and large ear structure, Kangaroo mice skulls are relatively larger in size to their body which contributes to their keen hearing used to detect predators.

Diet 
Both dark and pale kangaroo mice are herbivores, primarily granivorous. Their intake of food consists of seeds, grains, and nuts and in the summer, insects as well. Kangaroo mice use the front of their teeth to husk seeds, then carry and store in their fur-lined cheek pouches back to their burrowed homes. An extraordinary fact about some heteromyid species, such as the kangaroo mouse, is that they can spend several extended periods of time, even lifetimes, without consuming water. This is due to their efficient kidneys and ability to extract sufficient water from food and is essential in their survival in desert areas. The fat they get from their food is also stored in their tail.

Predation 
The fur color of both pale and dark Kangaroo mice aid in blending in background environments against predators. The system of their complex burrows help them in escaping predators including a high-pitched squeal that is called out when threatened.

Known Predators

 Coyotes (Canis Latrans)
 Weasels (Mustelidae)
 Owls (Stringidae)
 Rattlesnakes (Crotalus)
 Foxes (Vulpes species)
 Badgers (Taxidea Taxus)

See also

 Hopping mouse – a similar murid rodent native to Australia; an example of parallel evolution
 Jerboa – a similar dipodid rodent native to northern Africa and Asia
 Jumping mouse – a non-desert-dwelling dipodid rodent native to China and North America
 Kangaroo rat – a closely related heteromyid rodent of North America
 Rat-kangaroo – a smaller Australian marsupial relative of the kangaroos and wallabies
 Springhare – a similar pedetid rodent native to southern and eastern Africa

References

 
 
 
 

 
Heteromyidae
Taxa named by Clinton Hart Merriam